Anutt is an unincorporated community in western Dent County, in the U.S. state of Missouri.

The community is located along a ridge at the intersection of routes O and C approximately 15 miles south of Rolla. The community of Lenox is 4.5 miles to the south along Route C. Edgar Springs is seven miles to the west in Phelps County and Salem is 12 miles to the east.

History
A post office called Anutt was established in 1890, and remained in operation until 1963. The community was named after Annet Lenox, a local educator.

In 1925, Anutt had 137 inhabitants.

References

Unincorporated communities in Dent County, Missouri
Unincorporated communities in Missouri